Taherabad-e Torkha Jadid (also Romanized as Ţāherābād-e Torkhā Jadīd) is a village in Pasakuh Rural District, Zavin District, Kalat County, Razavi Khorasan Province, Iran. At the 2006 census, its population was 184, in 45 families.

References 

Populated places in Kalat County